Abdollah Masud-e Olya (also Romanized as ‘Abdollāh Mas‘ūd-e ‘Olyā) is a village in Hesar-e Valiyeasr Rural District, Central District, Avaj County, Qazvin Province, Iran. At the 2006 census, its population was 149, in 32 families.

References 

Populated places in Avaj County